John Timothy Frame (8 December 1930 – August 4, 2017) 
was the eighth Bishop of Yukon and acting Metropolitan of British Columbia.

Frame was educated at the University of Toronto and ordained in 1957. He was at Burns Lake Mission, Caledonia until his ordination to the episcopate in 1968. In 1973 he became Metropolitan of British Columbia, resigning in 1980. From then, until his retirement in 1995, he was the Rector of Christ Church Cathedral, Victoria and Dean of Columbia.

References

1930 births
2017 deaths
University of Toronto alumni
Anglican bishops of Yukon
20th-century Anglican Church of Canada bishops
20th-century Anglican archbishops
Metropolitans of British Columbia
Anglican Church of Canada deans